Fukang is a county-level city in Xinjiang Uygur Autonomous Region, China. Fukang is located in Northern Xinjiang in Changji Hui Autonomous Prefecture, north of Ürümqi.

History
As early as the Han and Tang dynasties, Fukang was an important stopover on the ancient Silk Road. The Qianlong Emperor of the Qing dynasty established it as a county in 1776. Its status was changed to a city in November 1992.

Climate

Economy
In 2007, Fukang City's GDP was 4.822 billion yuan, 2.3 times that of 2002, an average annual increase of 17.6%. Per capita GDP reached 30,000 yuan, 2.1 times that of 2002, an average annual increase of 16.5%.

Fukang's economy relies primarily on heavy industry, agriculture and tourism.

Among the tourist attractions in the area are Bogda Peak and the Heavenly Lake of Tianshan.

Bogeda Biosphere Reserve, in the east part of the Tianshan Mountains, was designated a member of UNESCO's Man and Biosphere reserve in 1990.

Irrigated agriculture in the Fukang is enabled by streams flowing from the Tian Shan mountains, as well as by the eastern branch of the Irtysh–Karamay–Ürümqi Canal, which crosses the Gurbantünggüt Desert, bringing to Fukang water from the Irtysh River.

Transport
China National Highway 216

Special facts

In 2000 a 925 "gemstone meteorite", a pallasite meteorite known as Fukang meteorite, was found near Fukang. It is considered a large and a rare of meteorite. In 2008 the main mass was offered for sale at Bonhams for a value of US $2 million. However the lot remained unsold.

References

County-level divisions of Xinjiang
Populated places in Xinjiang
Changji Hui Autonomous Prefecture